Marrying the Mafia (lit. "Family's Honor") is a 2002 South Korean film released on September 13, 2002. It was an instant hit, beating out other film competitors such as Jail Breakers, The Way Home and Sex is Zero.

The film sold 5,200,000 tickets, becoming 14th highest Korean films-ticket selling film. For the year of 2002 it was the highest-attended South Korean film, and the second highest-attended film (including international productions) in South Korea with 5,021,001 admissions nationwide.

Plot
The film is a gangster comedy about a businessman who becomes involved with the gangster underworld through the daughter of a crime boss.

A businessman and a young woman wake up in bed together with no knowledge of how they got there. Next, the businessman is confronted by the young woman's brothers, who are members of the mafias. The brothers demand that the businessman make an honorable woman of their sister.

Cast
 Jung Joon-ho as Park Dae-seo
 Kim Jung-eun as Jang Jin-kyeong
 Yoo Dong-geun as Jang In-tae (Jin-kyeong's brother)
 Sung Ji-ru as Jang Seok-tae (Jin-kyeong's brother)
 Park Sang-wook as Jang Kyeong-tae (Jin-kyeong's brother)
 Park Geun-hyung as Jang Jeong-jong (Jin-kyeong's father)
 Jin Hee-kyung as Won Hye-suk

English vocal cast
 John Gremillion as Park Dae-sun
 Shelly Calene-Black as Jang Jin-kyung
 Chris Ayres as Jang Jung-jong
 John Swasey as Jang In-tae
 Rob Mungle as Jang Seok-tae
 Mike MacRae as Jang Kyung-tae
 Jessica Boone as Lee Yoo-jin
 Celeste Roberts as Mi-soon
 Nancy Novotny as Won Hae-sook
 Jason Douglas as Sang-pal
 Andy McAvin as Dae-suh's Father
 Jennie Welch as Dae-suh's Mother
 Illich Guardiola as Manager
 Vic Mignogna as Yeo Min-seok
 Kim Prause as Jin-kyung's Friend
 Max Issacson as Jang Young-min
 David Born as Lawyer
 Ty Mahany as Dae-suh's Friend A
 Quinton Haag as Dae-suh's Friend B
 Rachel Buchman as School Violence Mother
 Rebekay Dahl as Yoo-jin's Mentor
 Nam as Ty Mahany
 David Born as TV Host Male
 Kim Prause as TV Host Female
 David Born as Security Guard
 Ty Mahany as Radio DJ
 Kim Prause as Hostess A
 Nancy Novotny as Hostess B
 Rebekay Dahl as Hostess C

English language and subtitled versions were presented by ADV Films.

Reception
G. Allen Johnson of the San Francisco Chronicle said that "[the film is] a comedy that tries too hard to be funny, therefore it isn't".

Sean Axmaker of the Seattle Post-Intelligencer said that "[the film's] unusual cultural details add a little color to the usual romantic turbulence, but it's otherwise as rote as its American counterparts".

See also
 Marrying the Mafia II
 Marrying the Mafia III
 Marrying the Mafia IV

Sources

References

External links
 
 
 

2000s Korean-language films
South Korean crime comedy films
Films about organized crime in South Korea
2000s crime comedy films
2000s South Korean films